Trefor Pryce Evans (born 26 November 1947, in Chorley) is a former Wales international rugby union player. He played as a flanker.

Evans played club rugby for Pantyffynon Youth RFC Amman United RFC and Swansea RFC.
 
He had 10 caps for Wales, from 1975 to 1977, scoring 2 tries, 8 points on aggregate. He played three times at the Five Nations Championship, in 1975, 1976 and 1977, scoring then all the points of his international career.

In 1977 he toured New Zealand with the British Lions, playing the first test. He then captained the mid week team.

Notes

References

1947 births
Living people
Barbarian F.C. players
British & Irish Lions rugby union players from Wales
Cambridge R.U.F.C. players
English rugby union players
Rugby union players from Chorley
Swansea RFC players
Wales international rugby union players
Welsh rugby union players
Rugby union flankers